"Etyma" is also the plural of "etymon"

Etyma is a genus of longhorn beetles of the subfamily Lamiinae, containing the following species:

 Etyma curu Galileo & Martins, 2012
 Etyma icima Galileo & Martins, 2012

References

Desmiphorini